Monday Riku Morgan  is a retired Nigerian Airforce officer who headed the Defence Intelligence Agency of Nigeria from July 2015 to January 2016.

Career
Morgan was the Air Officer Commanding (AOC), Logistics Command, Nigerian Air Force, Ikeja, Lagos before his appointment as CDI. Morgan, a seasoned fighter pilot, also had a stint as the Senior Air Staff Officer, Tactical Air Command, Nigerian Air Force, Makurdi. He was appointed as Chief of Defence Intelligence (CDI) on July 13, 2015, by President Muhammadu Buhari.

References 

Year of birth missing (living people)
Living people
People from Benue State
Nigerian Air Force air marshals
Nigerian Air Force officers
Nigerian security personnel
Chiefs of Nigeria Defence Intelligence Agency